Halbrite is a village in the Canadian province of Saskatchewan within the Rural Municipality of Cymri No. 36 and Census Division No. 2. The village is located approximately 20 kilometres south-east of the city of Weyburn on Highway 39 at the intersections of Highway 606 and 705.

Halbrite gets its name from three engineers who, at the time, worked with the Canadian Pacific Railway. Each contributed parts of their last names to make up the community's name: Hall, Bruce, and White.

During the Second World War the Royal Canadian Air Force constructed a Relief Landing Field for RCAF Station Weyburn approximately 2 miles south of the village.

History 
Halbrite incorporated as a village on February 26, 1904.

Demographics 

Notable people 

 Levi Eiteneier - Boundary Dam Power Station B Plant Third Class Operating Engineer

See also 

 List of communities in Saskatchewan
 Villages of Saskatchewan
 List of geographic acronyms and initialisms

References

Villages in Saskatchewan
Cymri No. 36, Saskatchewan
Division No. 2, Saskatchewan